Stranda Fjord Trail Race is a  long distance race with  meters of vertical climb. The race attracts many international runners and takes place since 2015 in the mountains around Stranda on the Norwegian coast. The course takes the runners along the Geirangerfjord.

Winners
The course records are for men 4:02:15 by Sindre Hoff (2016) and for women 4:39:13 by Yoie Bohlin (2016).
Course records with green background in the table.

References

External links
 

Trail running competitions
Athletics competitions in Norway
Golden Trail Series